Jim the Boy is a coming-of-age novel by Tony Earley, published by Little, Brown in 2000. It details the early life of Jim Glass, who lives with his mother, Elizabeth, and three uncles, in the small fictional town of Aliceville, North Carolina.

Allusions from other works
Nashville Musician Paul Burch, Earley's neighbor at the time, was asked to write an album based on the story lines and characters in the book. The album, Last of My Kind, was released by Merge Records in 2001.
In one scene Jan Karon's book In This Mountain, the local bookseller is seen reading Jim the Boy

References

2000 American novels
Novels set in North Carolina
Little, Brown and Company books
American bildungsromans